× Miltonidium, abbreviated as Mtdm. in the horticultural trade, is the nothogenus for hybrids between the orchid genera Miltonia and Oncidium (Milt. × Onc.).

An example is Miltonidium Purple Sunset, which is a hybrid of Miltonia Victoria and Oncidium hastilabium.

History
Several grexes were formerly placed in × Miltonidium, which are now in × Gomonia (= Miltonia × Gomesa), for instance Gomonia Mateus Pomini UEL, generated from Miltonia regnellii × Gomesa imperatoris-maximiliani, two native Brazilian orchids. This hybrid was registered with the Royal Horticultural Society in May 2005.

References

Orchid nothogenera
Oncidiinae